Podlipnoye is a rural locality (a village) in Velikodvorskoye Rural Settlement, Totemsky District, Vologda Oblast, Russia. The population was 38 as of 2002.

Geography 
Podlipnoye is located 49 km south of Totma (the district's administrative centre) by road. Veliky Dvor is the nearest rural locality.

References 

Rural localities in Tarnogsky District